The Upplands Fotbollförbund (Uppland Football Association) is one of the 24 district organisations of the Swedish Football Association. It administers lower tier football in the historical province of Uppland.

Background 

Upplands Fotbollförbund, commonly referred to as Upplands FF, was founded on 1 April 1917 is the governing body for football in Uppsala County and some municipalities in the northern peripherical part of Stockholm County. The Association currently has 156 member clubs.  Based in Uppsala, the Association's Chairman is Ingmar Alm.

Affiliated Members 

The following clubs are affiliated to the Upplands FF:

Almo BK
Almunge IK
Alsike IF
Alunda IF
Alunda UIF
Ararat Armenisk IK
Arlanda FF
Bälinge IF
Bålsta FF
BK Simul
BKV Norrtälje
Blidö IF
Börje SK
Bro IK
Brottby SK
Danmarks Dam FF
Danmarks IF
Edsbro IF
Enköpings IS
Enköpings SK FK
Enköpings SK UK
Estuna IF
Fanna BK
FC Arlanda
FC BoCity Uppsala
FF Citykamraterna 05
Films SK
Fjärdhundra SK
Flogsta FC
Fortitudo FC
Frösunda SK
Funbo IF
Funbo TFF
Fyris FF
Gamla Upsala SK
Gamlis FF
Gårdskär GoIF
Gimo IF FK
Gimo IF Ungdomsklubb
GoIF Kåre
Gojo FF
Gottsunda AIF
Gräsö IF
Grisslehamns SK
Håbo FF
Håbro IF
Hagby IK
Hagunda IF
Hallsta IK
Harbo IF
Harg-Östhammar FF
Harg-Östhammar FK
Hargs IK
Härnevi BK
Häverödals SK
Heby AIF
Heby AIF FF
Holma FF
IF Ferro
IF Stjärnan
IF Trikadien
IF Vesta
IF Vindhemspojkarna Herrfotboll
IF VP Uppsala
IFK Dannemora/Österby
IFK Uppsala
IFK Uppsala UFF 
IK Apollon
IK Fyris
IK Gränby
IK Hinden
IK Nordia
IK Rex
IK Sirius FK
Järlåsa IF
Jumkils IF
Karlholm UFF
Karlholms GoIF
Knarrbacken FC
Knivsta IK
Knivsta SK
Knutby IF
Kurdiska FC Uppsala
Kurdiska FF Uppsala
Lagga- Långhundra BK
Lagunda AIK
Lindholmens FC
Livets Ord IF
Lohärads IF
Lokomotiv  06 FF
Månkarbo IF
Markim-Orkesta IF
Marma Mehede IF
Märsta IK
Morgongåva SK
Norrskedika FK
Norrskedika IF
Nyby FK
Procyon BK
Rådmansö SK
Rånäs IF
Rasbo IK
Riala GoIF
Rimbo IF
Rö IK
Rosersbergs IK
Roslagsbro IF
Runhällens BOIS
Sigtuna IF
Sirius Fotboll AB
SK Elvan
SK Iron
SK Wigör
Skånela AIF
Skepptuna IK
Skuttunge SK
Skyttorps IF
Söderbykarls IF
Söderfors GoIF
Södra Trögds IK
Södra Uppsala SK
Storvreta IK
Strömsbergs IF
Sunnersta AIF
Tärnsjö IF
Tierps DFF
Tierps IF
Tifen FF
Tobo/Örbyhus FF
Torpedo Kamrat BK
Ullfors IK
Unik FK
Upplands-Ekeby IF
Uppsala City FC
Uppsala FC
Uppsala Inter FC
Uppsala United FC
Uppsala-Kurd FK
Upsala IF
Upsala IF FF
Väddö IF
Vaksala FF
Vaksala SK
Valsta Syrianska IK
Vangen FBC
Vassunda IF
Vätö IK
Vattholma IF
Viksta IK
Vittinge IK
Åsunda IF
Älvkarleby IK
Ärentuna SK
Österlövsta FF
Östervåla IF
Östhammars SK

League Competitions 
Upplands FF run the following League Competitions:

Men's Football
Division 4  -  one section
Division 5  -  two sections
Division 6  -  four sections
Division 7  -  four sections
Division 8  -  four sections

Women's Football
Division 3  -  one section
Division 4  -  two sections
Division 5  -  three sections

Footnotes

External links 
 Upplands FF Official Website 

Upplands
Football in Uppsala County
Football in Stockholm County